Warren Jabali (August 29, 1946 – July 13, 2012) was an American basketball player.  He played professionally in the American Basketball Association (ABA) from 1968 to 1975.

Early career

Born Warren Edward Armstrong, Jabali changed his name while attending Wichita State University to reflect his African roots.  The name does not have any religious connotations as it is a Swahili word for "rock."  A skilled defender and rebounder and a remarkable leaper, the 6'2" Jabali was reported to be able to touch a ten-foot high basketball rim with his forehead. Although Wichita State, and the Missouri Valley Conference in general, supplied many pro players of the era, he did not receive much attention from the National Basketball Association (NBA).  He was drafted by the New York Knicks in the 4th round (8th pick, 44th overall) of the 1968 NBA draft; he signed instead with the Oakland Oaks of the rival ABA, who selected him in the 1968 ABA Draft.

ABA career

In his first season in the ABA, he won Rookie of the Year honors, prompting teammate Rick Barry to comment, "No doubt he's one of the best guards I've ever played with—or against". Later that season, Jabali averaged 33.2 points against the Indiana Pacers in the 1969 ABA Finals and was named Playoffs MVP.

As one of the most physically gifted guards in the American Basketball Association, Warren Jabali muscled his way through seven straight seasons of double-digit scoring, including 1968–69, when his average of 21.5 points per game earned him ABA Rookie of the Year honors. That season Jabali's efforts helped bring an ABA Championship to the Oakland Oaks, a team that also featured Rick Barry, Larry Brown, and Doug Moe.

Jabali became an instant star after coming into the league from Wichita State University. Although Barry, the Oaks' biggest attraction, won the league scoring title in 1968–69, he was only able to play in 35 games because of a severe knee ligament injury. It was Jabali, an immediate starter, who gave Coach Alex Hannum the extra scoring punch needed in Barry's absence.
With Jabali aboard and Barry helping for part of the season, the Oaks recorded a stunning 38-game turnaround to post a league-best 60-18 record. In the playoffs, they went 12-4 on the way to claiming the ABA Championship. A year later at midseason, with the team playing as the Washington Caps, an injury sidelined Jabali. Hurt shortly after playing in his first of four ABA All-Star Games, he was carrying an average of 22.8 points per game at the time.

Jabali made a comeback, although his final five years were spent with four teams. In his first season back, 1970–71, he was traded from the Kentucky Colonels to the Indiana Pacers on October 13, 1970, in exchange for a first-round draft choice and cash. Jabali saw action in 62 games with the Pacers. It was with the Pacers that Jabali started pulling the trigger from three-point land; he did it 163 times that year, making 47 treys.

He had a big year with the Florida Floridians the following season, averaging 19.9 points and hitting 102 of his 286 three-point attempts, among the most in the league. When the Miami-based franchise folded, Jabali moved to the Denver Rockets (later the Denver Nuggets). During his first campaign with the Rockets, Jabali's 16-point effort in the 1973 ABA All-Star Game keyed the West's come-from-behind victory and earned him Most Valuable Player honors. That game is often referred to as the Jabali's Jamboree.

After one more season in Denver and another with the San Diego Conquistadors, Jabali retired in 1975, at age 28.

In his seven-year professional career, Jabali played for the Oakland Oaks, Washington Capitals, the Indiana Pacers, The Floridians, the Denver Rockets, and the San Diego Conquistadors.  While playing for the Rockets in 1973, he was named the All-Star Game MVP and was named to the All-ABA First Team after averaging 17.0 points, 6.6 assists, and 5.2 rebounds.  Knee problems would soon limit his effectiveness, however, and he retired in 1975, having achieved career averages of 17.1 points, 5.3 assists, and 6.7 rebounds.

Warren Jabali died on July 13, 2012.

ABA career statistics

Regular season

|-
| style="text-align:left; background:#afe6ba;"| 1968–69
| style="text-align:left;"| Oakland
| 71 || ... || 35.8 || .449 || .250 || .684 || 9.7 || 3.5 || ... || ... || 21.5
|-
| style="text-align:left;"| 1969–70
| style="text-align:left;"| Washington
| 40 || ... || 37.8 || .445 || .306 || .717 || 10.4 || 4.3 || ... || ... || 22.8
|-
| style="text-align:left;"| 1970–71
| style="text-align:left;"| Indiana
| 62 || ... || 25.6 || .410 || .288 || .761 || 4.8 || 3.5 || ... || ... || 11.0
|-
| style="text-align:left;"| 1971–72
| style="text-align:left;"| Miami
| 81 || ... || 40.9 || .436 || .358 || .756 || 8.1 || 6.1 || ... || ... || 19.9
|-
| style="text-align:left;"| 1972–73
| style="text-align:left;"| Denver
| 82 || ... || 33.4 || .453 || .257 || .805 || 5.2 || 6.6 || 2.1 || ... || 17.0
|-
| style="text-align:left;"| 1973–74
| style="text-align:left;"| Denver
| 49 || ... || 34.9 || .391 || .366 || .803 || 5.0 || 7.3 || 2.0 || .2 || 15.9
|-
| style="text-align:left;"| 1974–75
| style="text-align:left;"| San Diego
| 62 || ... || 30.0 || .392 || .321 || .789 || 4.1 || 5.8 || 1.8 || .3 || 12.1
|-
| style="text-align:center;" colspan=2|Career
| 447 || ... || 34.1 || .431 || .319 || .756 || 6.7 || 5.3 || 2.0 || .3 || 17.1

Playoffs

|-
| style="text-align:left; background:#afe6ba;"| 1968–69
| style="text-align:left;"| Oakland
| 16 || ... || 41.4 || .460 || .176 || .668 || 12.9 || 2.9 || ... || ... || 28.8
|-
| style="text-align:left;"| 1970–71
| style="text-align:left;"| Indiana
| 11 || ... || 22.7 || .302 || .107 || .806 || 3.6 || 3.0 || ... || ... || 7.8
|-
| style="text-align:left;"| 1971–72
| style="text-align:left;"| Miami
| 4 || ... || 42.8 || .373 || .333 || .788 || 13.0 || 5.5 || ... || ... || 18.8
|-
| style="text-align:left;"| 1972–73
| style="text-align:left;"| Denver
| 5 || ... || 25.2 || .333 || .000 || .750 || 1.4 || 2.8 || ... || ... || 6.0
|-
| style="text-align:center;" colspan=2|Career
| 36 || ... || 33.6 || .415 || .167 || .702 || 8.5 || 3.2 || ... || ... || 18.1
|-

References

External links
Career stats at basketball-reference.com
Warren Jabali at Remember the ABA
Warren Jabali in His Own Words at HoopsHype.com

1946 births
2012 deaths
African-American basketball players
Basketball players from Kansas
American men's basketball players
Denver Rockets players
Indiana Pacers players
Kentucky Colonels players
Miami Floridians players
New York Knicks draft picks
Oakland Oaks draft picks
Oakland Oaks players
Point guards
San Diego Conquistadors players
Shooting guards
Sportspeople from Kansas City, Kansas
Washington Caps players
Wichita State Shockers men's basketball players
20th-century African-American sportspeople
21st-century African-American people